Milverton may refer to:

Places
 Milverton, Ontario, Canada
 Milverton Four Wheel Drives, a senior hockey team based out of Milverton, Ontario
 Milverton, Somerset, England
 Church of St Michael, Milverton, Somerset
 Hundred of Milverton, a historical Hundred in the ceremonial county of Somerset
 The Old House, Milverton, Somerset, a Grade II* listed building
 Milverton, Leamington, an electoral ward of Leamington Spa, Warwickshire, England

People
 Baron Milverton, a title in the Peerage of the United Kingdom
 Arthur Richards, 1st Baron Milverton (18851978)
 Charles Augustus Milverton, a fictional character in "The Adventure of Charles Augustus Milverton" by Arthur Conan Doyle

See also
 Old Milverton, a hamlet near Leamington Spa, England
 Warwick (Milverton) railway station, England